Roger Smith is a former football (soccer) player who represented New Zealand at international level.

Smith made a solitary official international appearance for the All Whites in a 0–6 loss to Australia on 14 August 1948.

Three of his brothers also represented New Zealand, Gordon Smith and Vic Smith making official international appearances, while the third brother, Jack Smith, only played in unofficial matches. Ryan Nelsen, grandson of another brother, Bob Smith, also played for New Zealand

References 

Year of birth missing
Possibly living people
New Zealand association footballers
New Zealand international footballers
20th-century New Zealand people
Association footballers not categorized by position